Candace Beinecke is Senior Partner of Hughes Hubbard & Reed, where in 1999 she became the first female head of a major New York firm.
In November 2020 she was named Co-Chair of the Board of the Metropolitan Museum of Art with Hamilton James, effective January 12, 2021, the first time the museum had two chairs and the first time its Chair was a woman. She has also served as the Board Chair of the Wallace Foundation since 2017.

Beinecke grew up in Paterson, New Jersey, the daughter of a radio host Tippie Taylor, and graduated from Rutgers Law School in 1970. She is the wife of Frederick Beinecke.

References

Living people
Year of birth missing (living people)
Rutgers Law School alumni
American lawyers
American women lawyers
People from Paterson, New Jersey
21st-century American women